ICIS can refer to:

Integrated Cadastral Information Society, a non-profit organization
International Conference on Information Systems, an annual academic conference in Information Systems 
Instrumentation, Control and Intelligent Systems, a distinctive signature organization in the Idaho National Laboratory
Internal Counter-Intelligence Service, a fictional organization in the Doctor Who universe